The Tipperary Senior Hurling Championship (known for sponsorship reasons as the FBD Insurance Tipperary County Senior Hurling Championship) is an annual hurling competition organised by the Tipperary County Board of the Gaelic Athletic Association since 1887 for the top hurling teams in the county of Tipperary in Ireland.

The series of games are played during the summer and autumn months with the county final currently being played at Semple Stadium in October. The prize for the winning team is the Dan Breen Cup. Initially played as a knock-out competition on a divisional basis, the championship currently features a group stage followed by a knock-out stage.

The Tipperary County Championship is an integral part of the wider Munster Senior Club Hurling Championship. The winners of the Tipperary county final join the champions of the other four hurling counties to contest the provincial championship.

32 teams currently participate in the Tipperary County Championship. The title has been won at least once by 25 different teams. The all-time record-holders are Thurles Sarsfields, who have won a total of 36 titles.

Clonoulty-Rossmore won the 2018 Championship, their first championship since 1997 after a 0-23 to 2-13 win against Nenagh Éire Óg in the final.

History

Beginnings

Following the foundation of the Gaelic Athletic Association (GAA) in 1884, new rules for Gaelic football and hurling were drawn up and published in the United Irishman newspaper. County committees were quickly established, with the Tipperary County Board affiliating in 1886. Over the course of the following year, 130 clubs registered with the GAA in Tipperary, making it the strongest county in the country. After difficulties in organising the early championships, the title has been awarded every year except on one occasion since 1894. Civil unrest at the height of the War of Independence resulted in the 1920 championship being cancelled.

Team dominance

Since the beginning, the championship has seen periods of dominance by various teams. Tubberadora became the preeminent team of the first decade, before being superseded by Thurles Sarsfields. After winning the inaugural title in 1887, the Thurles-based club won six championships from a possible nine between 1904 and 1911. Toomevara made their first big breakthrough in 1910 and won titles at regular intervals over the course of the next twenty years. Boherlahen-Dualla won the first of four successive championship titles in 1915 and won a grand total of ten up to and including the 1941 championship. Thurles Sarsfields bounced back in 1929 after an eleven-year period in the doldrums. Over the course of the next 45 years the club established itself as the standard bearer of club hurling in Tipperary by winning 21 titles during this period. The club reached its peak by winning ten titles in eleven championship seasons between 1955 and 1965. Roscrea won their first championship in 1968 before completing a three-in-a-row in 1970. The club won further titles in 1972, 1973 and 1980. Moneygall and Kilruane MacDonagh's shared five titles between 1975 and 1979, while Borris-Ileigh won three titles throughout the 1980s. After failing to win a championship in over thirty years, Toomevara returned to the top table in 1992. Over the course of the next sixteen years the club claimed 11 championship titles. Thurles Sarsfields also returned to their winning ways after a 31-year barren spell by claiming the 2005 championship. They have since become the most successful team of the 21st century by winning eight championships.

Format

The Tipperary senior hurling championship is probably the most complicated system in Ireland as it has striven to accommodate from 25 to, currently, 32 teams. A knockout divisional system and group backdoor system has been introduced to accommodate these teams. Before the new system, the county championship was run on a divisional basis with the teams in the divisional finals going into the county quarter-finals and proceeding from there.

A new format is to be introduced in 2014, with the county championship divided into two sections of 16 teams each, the sections determined by clubs' placings in the 2013 championship. Each section will be divided into four groups of four teams with games played on a round robin basis. The top two teams in each Section 1 group, and the top team in each Section 2 group, qualify for the knockout stages, as do the four divisional champions. The bottom team in each Section 1 group is relegated to Section 2, and the top team in each Section 2 group is promoted to Section 1. The bottom teams in each of the Section 2 groups face relegation play-offs, with two teams relegated to the Intermediate Championship. The Intermediate champions move up to Section 2. Thus in 2015 there will be 31 teams in the Senior Championship.

Sponsorship

For four years between 2013 and 2016, the championship was sponsored by Clean Ireland Recycling. In August 2016, the Tipperary County Board announced that they had signed a three-year sponsorship deal with Tipperary Water. The company has since sponsored all of Tipperary's adult county championships.

Qualification for subsequent competitions

The Tipperary Senior Hurling Championship winners qualify for the subsequent Munster Senior Club Hurling Championship. This place is reserved for club teams only as divisional and amalgamated teams are not allowed in the provincial championship.

Venues

Early rounds

Fixtures in the group stage and early knock-out rounds of the championship are usually played at a neutral venue that is deemed halfway between the participating teams. Some of the more common venues include MacDonagh Park, St. Cronan's Park and St. Michael's Park. All games from the quarter-finals onward are played at Semple Stadium.

Final 

The final is usually played at Semple Stadium, previously Thurles Sportsfield.

Managers

Managers in the Tipperary Championship are involved in the day-to-day running of the team, including the training, team selection, and sourcing of players. Their influence varies from club-to-club and is related to the individual club committees. The manager is assisted by a team of two or three selectors and a backroom team consisting of various coaches.

Trophy

The winning team is presented with the Dan Breen Cup. A native of Donohill, Dan Breen (1894-1969) was a volunteer in the Irish Republican Army during the Irish War of Independence and the Irish Civil War. In later years, he was a Fianna Fáil politician.

Top winners

Roll of honour

Records and statistics

Final

Team

Most wins: 36: 
Thurles Sarsfields (1887, 1904, 1906, 1907, 1908, 1909, 1911, 1929, 1935, 1936, 1938, 1939, 1942, 1944, 1945, 1946, 1952, 1955, 1956, 1957, 1958, 1959, 1961, 1962, 1963, 1964, 1965, 1974, 2005, 2009, 2010, 2012, 2014, 2015, 2016, 2017)
Most consecutive wins: 5:
Thurles Sarsfields (1955, 1956, 1957, 1958, 1959)
Thurles Sarsfields (1961, 1962, 1963, 1964, 1965)
Most appearances in a final: 46:
Thurles Sarsfields (1887, 1894, 1904, 1906, 1907, 1908, 1909, 1911, 1929, 1935, 1936, 1938, 1939, 1942, 1944, 1945, 1946, 1952, 1955, 1956, 1957, 1958, 1959, 1960, 1961, 1962, 1963, 1964, 1965, 1968, 1970, 1979, 1992, 2000, 2001, 2002, 2003, 1974, 2005, 2009, 2010, 2012, 2014, 2015, 2016, 2017)
Most appearances in a final without ever winning: 5
 Lorrha (1905, 1948, 1956, 1966, 1984)
Most appearances in a final without losing (streak): 21 
Thurles Sarsfields (1904, 1906, 1907, 1908, 1909, 1911, 1929, 1935, 1936, 1938, 1939, 1942, 1944, 1945, 1946, 1952, 1955, 1956, 1957, 1958, 1959)
Most defeats: 11
Roscrea (1936, 1945, 1954, 1963, 1967, 1971, 1976, 1978, 1981, 1982, 1985)

Individual

Most wins by a player: 14, Mickey Byrne (Thurles Sarsfields) (1944, 1945, 1946, 1952, 1955, 1956, 1957, 1958, 1959, 1961, 1962, 1963, 1964, 1965)

Teams

By decade

The most successful team of each decade, judged by number of Tipperary Senior Hurling Championship titles, is as follows:

 1890s: 3 for Tubberadora (1895-96-98)
 1900s: 5 for Thurles Sarsfields (1904-06-07-08-09)
 1910s: 5 for Toomevara (1910-12-13-14-19)
 1920s: 5 for Boherlahen-Dualla (1922-24-25-27-28)
 1930s: 4 each for Moycarkey-Borris (1932-33-34-37) and Thurles Sarsfields (1935-36-38-39)
 1940s: 4 for Thurles Sarsfields (1942-44-45-46)
 1950s: 6 for Thurles Sarsfields (1952-55-56-57-58-59)
 1960s: 5 for Thurles Sarsfields (1961-62-63-64-65)
 1970s: 3 each for Roscrea (1970-72-73) and Kilruane MacDonagh's (1977-78-79)
 1980s: 3 for Borris-Ileigh (1981-83-86)
 1990s: 5 for Toomevara (1992-93-94-98-99)
 2000s: 6 for Toomevara (2000-01-03-04-06-08)
 2010s: 6 for Thurles Sarsfields (2010-12-14-15-16-17)

Gaps

Top ten longest gaps between successive championship titles:
 101 years: Clonoulty-Rossmore (1888-1989)
 55 years: Boherlahen-Dualla (1941-1996)
 42 years: Moycarkey-Borris (1940-1982)
 37 years: Kilruane MacDonaghs (1985-2022)
 36 years: Holycross-Ballycahill (1954-1990)
 32 years: Toomevara (1960-1992)
 31 years: Thurles Sarsfields (1974-2005)
 29 years: Toomevara (1931-1960)
 28 years: Borris-Ileigh (1953-1981)
 20 years: Toomevara (1890-1910)

Top scorers

Finals (1980-present)

See also

 List of Tipperary Senior Hurling Championship winners

References

External links
Tipperary on Hoganstand
Tipperary Club GAA
Premierview

 
Hurl
Senior hurling county championships
1